Ville-Valtteri Leskinen (born 18 February 1994) is a Finnish professional ice hockey forward. He is currently playing with Färjestad BK of the Swedish Hockey League (SHL)

He previously played with Oulun Kärpät of the Finnish Liiga, winning the Kanada-malja in the 2017–18 season.

After establishing his professional career in three successful seasons with Oulun, Leskinen left as a free agent following the 2018–19 season. On 26 June 2019, Leskinen signed a two-year contract with Swedish club, Färjestad BK of the SHL.

Awards and honours

References

External links
 

1994 births
Living people
Finnish ice hockey forwards
Sportspeople from Oulu
Oulun Kärpät players
KalPa players
Vaasan Sport players
Finnish expatriate ice hockey players in Sweden